Manchester Communication Academy is a secondary school in Harpurhey, Manchester which opened in September 2010 and specialises in communication-related subjects including speaking and listening, languages, drama, media and presentation skills, and information communication technology.

Building
The school was built in 2009-10 by Laing O'Rourke at a site on the corner of Rochdale Road and Queen's Road. Monsall Metrolink station is near the school. The school opened up for staffs and students on The 9 September 2010. 
The school has six different departments. Maths, English, Science, Creative Arts (Art, Music and Drama), Health and Wellbeing (P.E, Cooking and Hospitality/Catering) and Global Understanding (History, Geography, Citizenship, RE, ICT and MFL).

Sponsors
The school's lead sponsor is BT and its co-sponsors are Manchester City Council and The Manchester College. The name of the Principal is Susan Watmough.

References

External links
MCA website

Academies in Manchester
Secondary schools in Manchester
2010 establishments in England
Educational institutions established in 2010